Dance Craze is a 1981 American documentary film about the British 2 Tone music genre.

The film was directed by Joe Massot, who originally wanted to do a film only about the band Madness, whom he met during their first US tour. Massot later changed his plans to include the whole 2 Tone movement. The film, shot in 1980, comprised performance footage of Madness, The Specials, The Selecter, The Bodysnatchers, the Beat and Bad Manners on tour throughout the United Kingdom. A soundtrack album of the same name was released the same year, featuring fifteen of the songs that were featured in the film. Later versions of the soundtrack album do not contain the Madness tracks, adding tracks credited to the Special AKA, a later incarnation of the Specials.

Songs
 "Nite Klub" – The Specials
 "The Prince" – Madness
 "Ne-Ne-Na-Na-Na-Na-Nu-Nu" – Bad Manners
 "007 (Shanty Town)" – The Bodysnatchers
 "Three Minute Hero" – The Selecter
 "Ranking Full Stop" – The Beat
 "Big Shot" – The Beat
 "Concrete Jungle" – The Specials
 "Swan Lake" – Madness
 "Razor Blade Alley" – Madness
 "Missing Words" – The Selecter
 "Let's Do the Rock Steady" – The Bodysnatchers
 "Lip Up Fatty" – Bad Manners
 "Madness" – Madness
 "Too Much Too Young" – The Specials
 "On My Radio" – The Selecter
 "Easy Life" – The Bodysnatchers
 "Rough Rider" – The Beat
 "Man at C&A" – The Specials
 "Inner London Violence" – Bad Manners
 "Night Boat to Cairo" – Madness
 "Twist and Crawl" – The Beat
 "Wooly Bully" – Bad Manners
 "Too Much Pressure" – The Selecter
 "Mirror in the Bathroom" – The Beat
 "One Step Beyond" – Madness
 "Nite Klub" – The Specials

Soundtrack LP

Side One
 "Concrete Jungle" – The Specials
 "Mirror In The Bathroom" – The Beat
 "Lip Up Fatty" – Bad Manners
 "Razor Blade Alley" – Madness
 "Three Minute Hero" – The Selecter
 "Easy Life" – The Bodysnatchers
 "Big Shot" – The Beat
 "One Step Beyond" – Madness

Side Two
 "Ranking Full Stop" – The Beat
 "Man At C&A" – The Specials
 "Missing Words" – The Selecter
 "Inner London Violence" – Bad Manners
 "Night Boat To Cairo" – Madness
 "Too Much Pressure" – The Selecter
 "Nite Klub" – The Specials

References

External links

[ Dance Craze at AllMusic.com]

1981 films
2 Tone Records
British documentary films
Documentary films about music and musicians
1981 documentary films
Films directed by Joe Massot
1980s English-language films
The Specials live albums
Madness (band) live albums
1980s British films